The Philippine Senate Committee on Cooperatives is a standing committee of the Senate of the Philippines.

Jurisdiction 
According to the Rules of the Senate, the committee handles all matters relating to:

 Cooperatives, both urban- and rural-based, including but not limited to farm credit and farm security, cooperative movements, and marketing and consumers' organizations
 Implementation of Republic Act No. 9520 or the Cooperative Code of the Philippines

Members, 18th Congress 
Based on the Rules of the Senate, the Senate Committee on Cooperatives has 9 members.

The President Pro Tempore, the Majority Floor Leader, and the Minority Floor Leader are ex officio members.

Here are the members of the committee in the 18th Congress as of September 24, 2020:

1 Zubiri is the Majority Floor Leader.

Committee secretary: Jingle Concon-Allam

See also 

 List of Philippine Senate committees

References 

Cooperatives